The National Development Front (NDF) was a Sunni Muslim organisation set up in Kerala. It was established in India in 1994.

History 
Inspired by pan-Islamic movements across the country after 1992, the NDF gained a strong foothold in the Malabar region following the banning of the Organization of Islamic Servants (ISS). The Kerala Police investigation found that the National Development Front (NDF) was another incarnation of the ISS. The NDF actively promoted the claim of "representing the rights of Muslims" to win the confidence of Muslims.

The National Development Front has 19 Supreme Council members. Among them is Prof P. Koya who was also one of the founding members of the Students Islamic Movement of India (SIMI, the affiliate of Indian Mujahideen).

In 1997, the NDF organized the National Human Rights Conference in Kozhikode. Based on deliberations and understanding, a new organization was formed called the Confederation of Human Rights Organizations (CHRO). 
The NDF worked closely with Thejas journalist Mukundan C Menon and journalists affiliated with the CHRO by closely connecting with Human Rights Watch International.

The NDF organized parades with the slogan "Be the Sentinels of Islam"<ref>{{cite web|url=http://www.hindu.com/2005/08/16/stories/2005081609430400.htm |archive-url=https://web.archive.org/web/20070427130211/http://www.hindu.com/2005/08/16/stories/2005081609430400.htm |url-status=dead |archive-date=27 April 2007 |title=Be the sentinel of Islam |date=16 August 2005 |work=The Hindu |access-date=11 May 2012}}</ref> in major cities of Kerala in 2004, 2005, and in 2006. The parade became one of the regular activities on the Indian Independence Day.

The NDF is in alliance with the Popular Front of India and collaborated in the Empower India conference held in Bangalore in February 2007.

In 2012, the NDF organized various communal movements, demonstrations, rallies and other strikes against police brutality and government misconduct, claiming the right to work more in government employment. Reservations and allowances were implemented for Muslims.

In 2021, the NDF was also involved in the hijab controversy in Kerala and Tamil Nadu by providing shelter, food and drink for those involved.

 Criticism 
The NDF was accused of being a communal outfit and members of the organisation were implicated in violent incidents such as the 2002 2nd Marad massacre. The Thomas P Joseph Commission report found that "activists of IUML and NDF, a Muslim outfit, were actively involved in the massacre". The State secretary of the Communist Party of India (Marxist) in Kerala, Pinarayi Vijayan, said that NDF was involved in the Marad massacre and referred to them as a "terrorist outfit" that executed a "planned mass murder". NDF was blamed for inciting violence against moderate Muslims in Kerala who are in opposition to liberal and reformist Islamic movements and individuals. The "involvement of fundamentalists and terrorists" was behind the incident.

The Bharatiya Janata Party (BJP) put forward allegations that NDF maintains links with Pakistan's ISI. The BJP sought an inquiry into NDF-ISI links. The Indian National Congress raised doubts about the true nature of their activities. On 31 October 2006, the Congress launched a campaign against terrorism in Malappuram district in Kerala, simultaneously taking on parties and organisations such as the IUML, the Communist Party of India (Marxist), the NDF, and the People's Democratic Party (PDP).

 Foreign connection 
Ms Neera Rawat IPS, Senior Superintendent of Police, Bareilly, Uttar Pradesh, deposed before the Marad Judicial Inquiry Commission of Justice Thomas P. Joseph. Her tenure as Kozhikode City Police Commissioner was from 22 March 1997 to 16 May 1999. She told the Inquiry Commission that the police had prepared confidential and authentic reports that ISI and Iran have funded the NDF.

Assistant Commissioner of Police (ACP) Special Branch, Ernakulam, A.V. George, also deposed before the Marad inquiry panel on 29 October 2005, and stated that a key witness in an illegal arms possession case had given a statement to the police during its investigation that the NDF had been receiving crores of rupees from foreign countries to carry out its training programmes. ACP George quoted the testimony made by arrested NDF cadres that the NDF had been sending people to Pakistan for the last several years.

 Kottakkal Police station attack 
Police accused that NDF activists attacked the Kottakkal police station at Kottakkal in Malappuram district in the early hours of 23 March 2007 following the arrest of two senior leaders of the front. The attack was repulsed by the police and 27 activists were taken into custody.

 Modus operandi Frontline magazine quoted a senior police officer as saying that the NDF had successfully exploited the sense of insecurity created in the Muslim community by events that followed the Babri Masjid demolition to find supporters in northern Kerala, irrespective of their political or other allegiances. The report adds: "Initially, no NDF member used to acknowledge openly that he was an NDF member. They would always claim that they were members of other organisations.  The truth may be that members of several organisations were members of the NDF also.  Now the NDF has several wings and is making a major effort to project itself as a socio-cultural organisation of Muslims."

 Pakistan MP visit row 
Pakistan MP Mohammed Thaha Mohammed's visit to Thalassery on 29 April 2007 sparked a controversy, with activists of the BJP and other Sangh Parivar groups staging a march to the hotel where Mohammed was staying. They claimed that leaders of a few Muslim organisations, including the NDF, were seen visiting the MP.

 Additional views 
University of Haifa political scientist David Bukay lists the NDF as a "fundamentalist and subversive group". After the 11 July 2006 Mumbai Train Bombings, the NDF, along with other Islamist organisations, was closely monitored by authorities for terrorist links. The organisation attracted numerous Islamic Fundamentalists to their ranks, and are compared to several more well-known militant Islamist groups such as Lashkar-e-Toiba, Hizbul Mujahideen, and others.

 Implementation of religious code 
The NDF is alleged to be involved in efforts to push the Islamic Sharia code among the moderate and cosmopolitan Muslim society in Kerala, an act viewed by moderate Muslims and secularists as Talibanization. NDF was accused of targeting liberals in the community – those who do not strictly follow Islamic laws like abstaining from liquor, fasting during Ramadan, and wearing the makhna or purdah. The NDF has been linked to multiple murder cases, including that of a Muslim fakir known by the alias Siddhan for indulging in what they saw as "un-Islamic spiritualism" and of a Muslim man from Punalur for working for a leftist organisation.

 NDF's aggressive response to criticism 

The NDF denied involvement in the Marad massacre. It alleged that the entire blame for the incident lay with the Rashtriya Swayamsevak Sangh and other "socialist Hindus". He indirectly made an aggressive threat that "there will be trouble" if "any Muslim is caught by the police".they "welcomed the CBI investigation" into the Marad riots.The NDF criticized the media and officials for not supporting the militant outfit and portraying the BJP badly.

 See also 
 Ghazwa-e-Hind
 Kafir
 Popular Front of India
 Foreign Aid
 Love Jihad

 References 

 External links 
  Probe into Marad riots, Times of India, 28 September 2006
 Rajeev Pi, In Kerala bastion, CPM fights hardline Muslim violence, Sunday Express, 20 August 2006 accessed at Indianexpress.com 29 December 2006
 In Kerala bastion, CPM fights hardline Muslim violence – The Indian Express
 Islamic Extremism and Subversion in South Asia – Ajai Sahni
  Probe into Marad riots, Times of India, 28 September 2006
 Court Rejects Anti-National'' Charge Against islamic leader PUCL.org
 Empower India Conference 15–17 February

Islamist groups
Islamic political organizations
Islam-related controversies in Asia
Religiously motivated violence in India
Defunct political parties in Kerala
Islamic organisations based in India
1993 establishments in Kerala
Indian Mujahideen
Islamist front organizations